Muricauda lutaonensis is a Gram-negative, aerobic, rod-shaped moderately thermophilic and non-motile bacterium of the genus Muricauda which has been isolated from a hot spring on Green Island off the coast of Taiwan. The strain CC-HSB-11 of Muricauda lutaonensis produces zeaxanthin.

References

External links
Type strain of Muricauda lutaonensis at BacDive -  the Bacterial Diversity Metadatabase

Further reading 
 
 

Flavobacteria
Bacteria described in 2009